The Culture series is a science fiction series written by Scottish author Iain M. Banks and released from 1987 through to 2012. The stories centre on The Culture, a utopian, post-scarcity space society of humanoid aliens, and advanced superintelligent artificial intelligences living in artificial habitats spread across the Milky Way galaxy. The main themes of the series are the dilemmas that an idealistic, more-advanced civilization faces in dealing with smaller, less-advanced civilizations that do not share its ideals, and whose behaviour it sometimes finds barbaric. In some of the stories action takes place mainly in non-Culture environments, and the leading characters are often on the fringes of (or non-members of) the Culture, sometimes acting as agents of Culture (knowing and unknowing) in its plans to civilize the galaxy. Each novel is a self-contained story with new characters, although reference is occasionally made to the events of previous novels.

The Culture

The Culture is a society formed by various humanoid species and artificial intelligences about 9,000 years before the events of novels in the series. Since the majority of its biological population can have almost anything they want without the need to work, there is little need for laws or enforcement, and the culture is described by Banks as space socialism. It features a post-scarcity economy where technology is advanced to such a degree that all production is automated. Its members live mainly in spaceships and other off-planet constructs, because its founders wished to avoid the centralised political and corporate power-structures that planet-based economies foster. Most of the planning and administration is done by Minds, very advanced AIs.

Although the Culture has more advanced technology and a more powerful economy than the vast majority of known civilizations, it is only one of the "Involved" civilizations that take an active part in galactic affairs. The much older Homomda are slightly more advanced at the time of Consider Phlebas (this is, however, set several centuries before the other books, and Culture technology and martial power continue to advance in the interim); the Morthanveld have a much larger population and economy, but are hampered by a more restrictive attitude to the role of AI in their society. The capabilities of all such societies are vastly exceeded by those of the Elder civilisations (semi-retired from Galactic politics but who remain supremely potent) and even more so by those of the Sublimed, entities which have abandoned their material form for existence in the form of non-corporeal, multi-dimensional energy being. The Sublimed generally refrain from intervention in the material world.

Some other civilizations hold less favourable views of the Culture. At the time of their war with the Culture, the Idirans and some of their allies regarded the control that the Minds exercised over the Culture as a form of idolatry. The Homomda regard the Culture as idealistic and hyper-active. Some members of the Culture have seceded to form related civilizations, known collectively as the Ulterior. These include the Peace Faction, the AhForgetIt Tendency and the Zetetic Elench. Others simply drop out temporarily or permanently.

Books in the series
The Culture series comprises nine novels and one short story collection. The list, ordered by date of publishing, is:

Main themes
Since the Culture's biological population commonly live as long as 400 years and have no need to work, they face the difficulty of giving meaning to their lives when the Minds and other intelligent machines can do almost anything better than the biological population can. Many try—few successfully—to join Contact, the Culture's combined diplomatic / military / government service, and fewer still are invited to the even more elite Special Circumstances (SC), Contact's secret service and special operations division. Normal Culture citizens vicariously derive meaning from their existence via the works of Contact and SC. Banks described the Culture as "some incredibly rich lady of leisure who does good, charitable works... Contact does that on a large scale." The same need to find a purpose for existence contributed to the majority of the Culture embarking semi-voluntarily on its only recent full-scale war, to stop the expansion of the militaristic and expansionist Idirans—otherwise the Culture's economic and technological advancement would only have been an exercise in hedonism.

All of the stories feature the tension between the Culture's humane, anarcho-communist ideals and its need to intervene in the affairs of less enlightened and often less advanced civilisations.The first Culture novel, Consider Phlebas, describes an episode in the Idiran War, which the Culture's Minds foresaw would cause billions of deaths on both sides, but which their utilitarian calculations predicted would be the best course in the long term. The Idiran War serves as a recurring reference point in most of the subsequent novels, influencing the Culture's development for centuries and dividing its residents—both humanoids and AI Minds—along the pacifist and interventionist ideals.

In subsequent novels, the Culture—particularly SC and, to a lesser degree, Contact—continue to employ subterfuge, espionage, and even direct action (collectively called "dirty tricks") in order to protect itself and spread the Culture's "good works" and ideals. These dirty tricks include blackmailing persons, employing mercenaries, recruiting double agents, attempting to effect regime change, and even engaging in false flag operations against the Culture itself (potentially resulting in the death of billions). Though each of these individual actions would horrify the average Culture citizen, the Culture's Minds tend to justify these actions in terms of lives saved in the long-term, perhaps over the course of several hundred years. The Culture is willing to use not only preemptive, but also retaliatory actions in order to deter future hostile actions against itself. Banks commented that in order to prevent atrocities, "even the Culture throws away its usual moral rule-book." Andrew M. Butler noted that, "Having established the peaceful, utopian, game-playing tendencies of the Culture, ... in later volumes the Culture’s dirty tricks are more exposed."

The Culture stories have been described as "eerily prescient". Consider Phlebas explicitly presents a clash of civilizations, although this phrase was used by Samuel P. Huntington and earlier authors. This is highlighted by the novel's description of the Idirans' expansion as a "jihad" and by its epigraphic verse from the Koran, "Idolatry is worse than carnage". However, it was as much a "holy war" from the Culture's point of view.  Throughout the series, Contact and Special Circumstances show themselves willing to intervene, sometimes forcefully, in other civilizations to make them more Culture-like.

Much of Look to Windward is a commentary on the Idiran-Culture war, from a viewpoint 800 years later, mainly reflecting grief over both personal and large-scale losses and guilt over actions taken in the war. It combines these with similar reflections on the catastrophic miscarriage of the Culture's attempt to dissolve the Chelgrians' oppressive caste system. In neither case, however, does distress over the consequences of Culture policy lead its representatives to reject that policy. The book illustrates the limitations of power, and also points out that Minds and other AIs are as vulnerable as biological persons to grief, guilt and regrets.

Place within science fiction

According to critic Farah Mendelson, the Culture stories are space opera, with certain elements that are free from scientific realism, and Banks uses this freedom extravagantly in order to focus on the human and political aspects of his universe; he rejects the dystopian direction of present-day capitalism, which both cyberpunk and earlier space operas assume, in creating a post-scarcity society as the primary civilization of focus. Space opera had peaked in the 1930s, but started to decline as magazine editors such as John W. Campbell demanded more realistic approaches. By the 1960s many space operas were satires on earlier styles, such as Harry Harrison's Stainless Steel Rat and Bill, the Galactic Hero stories, while televised and film space operas such as Star Trek and Star Wars were thought to have dumbed down the subgenre. The Culture stories did much to revive space opera.

Literary techniques
Banks has been described as "an incorrigible player of games" with both style and structure – and with the reader. In both the Culture stories and his work outside science fiction, there are two sides to Banks, the "merry chatterer" who brings scenes to life and "the altogether less amiable character" who "engineers the often savage structure of his stories". Banks uses a wide range of styles. The Player of Games opens in a leisurely manner as it presents the main character's sense of boredom and inertia, and adopts for the main storyline a "spare, functional" style that contrasts with the "linguistic fireworks" of later stories. Sometimes the styles used in Excession relate to the function and focal character of the scene: slow-paced and detailed for Dajeil, who is still mourning over traumatic events that happened decades earlier; a parody of huntin', shootin', and fishin' country gentlemen, sometimes reminiscent of P. G. Wodehouse, when describing the viewpoint of the Affront; the ship Serious Callers Only, afraid of becoming involved in the conflict between factions of Minds, speaks in cryptic verse, while the Sleeper Service, acting as a freelance detective, adopts a hardboiled style. On the other hand, Banks often wrong-foots readers by using prosaic descriptions for the grandest scenery, self-deprecation and humour for the most heroic actions, and a poetic style in describing one of the Affront's killings.

He delights in building up expectations and then surprising the reader. Even in The Player of Games, which has the simplest style and structure of the series, the last line of the epilogue reveals who was really pulling the strings all along. In all the Culture stories, Banks subverts many clichés of space opera. The Minds are not plotting to take over the universe, and no-one is following a grand plan. The darkly comic double-act of Ferbin and Holse in Matter is not something most writers would place in "the normally po-faced context of space opera". Even the names of Culture spaceships are jokes – for example Lightly Seared on the Reality Grill, Experiencing a Significant Gravitas Shortfall (part of a running gag in the series) and Liveware Problem (see liveware).

Banks often uses "outsiders" as viewpoint characters, and said that using an enemy of the Culture as the main character of Consider Phlebas, the first story in the series, enabled him to present a more rounded view of the Culture. However, this character realises that his attempts to plan for anything that might conceivably happen on a mission are very similar to the way in which the Culture makes all its decisions, and by the end suspects he has chosen the wrong side.

The focal character of The Player of Games is bored with the lack of real challenges in his life, is blackmailed into becoming a Culture agent, admires the vibrancy of the Azad Empire but is then disgusted by its brutality, and wins the final of the tournament by playing in a style that reflects the Culture's values.

Use of Weapons features a non-Culture mercenary who accepts the benefits of association with the Culture, including immortality as the fee for his first assignment, and completes several dangerous missions as a Culture agent, but complains that he is kept in the dark about the aims of his missions and that in some of the wars he has fought maybe the Culture was backing both sides, with good reason.

Look to Windward uses three commentators on the Culture, a near-immortal Behemothaur, a member of the race plunged into civil war by a Culture intervention that went wrong, and the ambassador of a race at similar technological level to the Culture's.

The action scenes of the Culture stories are comparable to those of blockbuster films. In an interview, Banks said he would like Consider Phlebas to be filmed "with a very, very, very big budget indeed" and would not mind if the story were given a happy ending, provided the biggest action scenes were kept. On the other hand, The Player of Games relies mainly on the psychological tension of the games by which the ruler of the Azad Empire is selected.

Banks is unspecific about many of the background details in the stories, such as the rules of the game that is the centrepiece of The Player of Games, and cheerfully makes no attempt at scientific credibility.

Genesis of the series
Banks says he conceived the Culture in the 1960s, and that it is a combination of wish fulfilment and a reaction against the predominantly right-wing science fiction produced in the United States. In his opinion, the Culture might be a "great place to live", with no exploitation of people or AIs, and whose people could create beings greater than themselves.

Before his first published novel, The Wasp Factory (1984; not science fiction), was accepted in 1983, Banks wrote five books that were rejected, of which three were science fiction. In Banks' first draft of Use of Weapons in 1974, his third attempt at a novel, the Culture was just a backdrop intended to show that the mercenary agent was working for the "good guys" and was responsible for his own misdeeds. At the time he persuaded his friend Ken MacLeod to read it and MacLeod tried to suggest improvements, but the book had too much purple prose and a very convoluted structure. In 1984, shortly after The Wasp Factory was published, MacLeod was asked to read Use of Weapons again, and said there was "a good novel in there struggling to get out", and suggested the interleaved forwards and backwards narratives that appeared in the published version in 1990. The novella The State of the Art, which provides the title of the 1991 collection, dates from 1979, the first draft of The Player of Games from 1980 and that of Consider Phlebas from 1982.

Reception
Inversions won the 2004 Italia Science Fiction Award for the Best International Novel.

The American edition of Look to Windward was listed by the editors of SF Site as one of the "Best SF and Fantasy Books of 2001" after the UK edition had missed out by just one place the previous year.

Use of Weapons was listed in Damien Broderick's book Science Fiction: The 101 Best Novels 1985–2010.

As a posthumous tribute to Iain Banks, aerospace manufacturer SpaceX named two of its autonomous spaceport drone ships after sentient star ships Just Read the Instructions and Of Course I Still Love You which first appeared in the novel The Player of Games. A third drone craft was named A Shortfall of Gravitas, inspired by the star ship Experiencing a Significant Gravitas Shortfall in Look to Windward.

A further tribute was paid by the Five Deeps Expedition which named all of its craft after Culture ships and drones.

On an episode of Lex Fridman's podcast released on April 29, 2022, the artist Grimes said that Surface Detail of the Culture series is the greatest science fiction book ever written.

Notes

References

Bibliography

Primary sources
 .
 .
 .
 .
 .
 .
 .
 .
 .
 .

Secondary sources
 .
 .
 .
 .
 .
 .
 .
 .
 
 .
 .

Interviews and reviews
 .
 .
 .
 .
 .
 .
 
 
 .
 .
 .
 .
 .
 .
 .
 .
 .
 .
 .
 
 .
 .

News sources
 
 .
 .

 
Artificial intelligence in fiction
Fiction about consciousness transfer
Postcyberpunk novels
British science fiction
Drones in fiction
Novel series
Science fiction book series
Scottish novels
Smart drugs in fiction
Social science fiction
Space opera
Soft science fiction
Transhumanist books
Scottish science fiction